A spoke is a rod connecting the hub of a wheel with the traction surface.

Spoke or Spokes may also refer to:

 Spokes, the Lothian Cycle Campaign, a UK cycling campaign organisation
 Spokes Canterbury, a New Zealand cycling advocacy organisation
 Spoke (album), a 1997 album by the band Calexico
 Spokes (album), a 2003 album by Plaid
 Radial features in the rings of Saturn

See also
Spock (disambiguation)